KVSD-LD (channel 26) is a low-power religious television station in San Diego, California, United States, owned and operated by the Daystar Television Network. The station's transmitter is located on Woodson Mountain.

On July 27, 2022, Word of God Fellowship, parent organization of Daystar, announced its intent to purchase KVSD-LD from D'Amico Brothers Broadcasting for $1.3 million, pending approval of the Federal Communications Commission (FCC). The deal includes a time brokerage agreement (TBA) prior to closing.

References

Daystar (TV network) affiliates
VSD-LD
Television channels and stations established in 1999
Low-power television stations in the United States
1999 establishments in California